The  was an government organization of the Empire of Japan established on September 22, 1871 which lasted until April 21, 1872, replacing the Department of Divinities, which had been in charge of rituals and administration of the Shinto gods since the Ritsuryo system.

The move from a Department to a Ministry was intended as a downgrade in its importance.

The ministry sought to help the Proclamation of the Great Doctrine.

It was quickly changed into the Ministry of Religion.

References 

1872 disestablishments
Government agencies established in 1871
State Shinto
Former government ministries of Japan
Pages with unreviewed translations